Arroyo Cabral is a locality in Córdoba Province, Argentina, part of the General San Martín Department.

References

Populated places in Córdoba Province, Argentina